The 2012–13 Werder Bremen season was the club's 103rd season in its history. In 2012–13, the club participated in the Bundesliga, the top tier of German football; it is the club's 32nd consecutive season in this league, having been promoted from the 2. Bundesliga in 1981.

The club also took part in the 2012–13 edition of the DFB-Pokal, where it was knocked out by 3. Liga side Preußen Münster in the first round.

Review and events
Werder Bremen presented Wiesenhof as its new shirt sponsor on 13 August 2012. Supporters of the club were outraged over Wiesenhof's sponsorship of the club that several supporters have cancelled their membership in the club. The conduct of Wiesenhof was reported in a documentary in Germany in 2011 where they have been "accused of treating the poultry in its care cruelly and keeping them in inhumane conditions".

The club opened its Bundesliga campaign against Borussia Dortmund, the defending champions. The final score was 2–1 in favour of Borussia Dortmund.

Matches

Legend

Friendly matches

Pre-season

Friendlies

Liga-total-Cup

Bundesliga

DFB-Pokal

Squad

Squad and statistics

Sources:

|}

Kits

Sources

External links
 2012–13 SV Werder Bremen season at Weltfussball.de 
 2012–13 SV Werder Bremen season at kicker.de 
 2012–13 SV Werder Bremen season at Fussballdaten.de 

Werder Bremen
SV Werder Bremen seasons